The 2022 Kingston, Ontario municipal election was held on October 24, 2022, to elect the Mayor of Kingston, Kingston City Council and the Limestone District School Board, Algonquin and Lakeshore Catholic District School Board, Conseil des écoles publiques de l'Est de l'Ontario and Conseil des écoles catholiques du Centre-Est. The election was held on the same day as elections in every other municipality in Ontario.

The candidates registered to run for Kingston City Council and School Board Trustees are as follows:

Mayor

City Council

Countryside District #1

Loyalist-Cataraqui District #2

Collins-Bayridge District #3

Lakeside District #4

Portsmouth District #5

Trillium District #6

Kingscourt-Rideau District #7

Meadowbrook-Strathcona District #8

Williamsville District #9

Sydenham District #10

King's Town District #11

Pittsburgh District #12

English Language Public School Board Trustees

Countryside, Kingscourt-Rideau & Williamsville

King's Town, Pittsburgh & Frontenac Islands

Lakeside & Trillium

Loyalist-Cataraqui, Collins-Bayridge & Meadowbrook-Strathcona

Portsmouth & Sydenham

English Language Separate School Board Trustees

Algonquin & Lakeshore Catholic District School Board

French Language Public School Board Trustee

Le Conseil des écoles publiques de l'Est de l'Ontario - Geographic Region 2

French Language Separate School Board Trustee

Le Conseil des écoles catholiques du Centre-Est

References

Kingston
Kingston, Ontario